The Eighteenth Uttar Pradesh Assembly (Eighteenth Vidhan Sabha of Uttar Pradesh) is formed by the members elected in the 2022 Uttar Pradesh Legislative Assembly election. Elections at all the 403 seats of the state, were conducted in seven phases from 10 February 2022 to 7 March 2022 by the Election Commission of India. Counting started officially on the morning of 10 March 2022 and the results were declared on the same day.

Satish Mahana was elected as the speaker of the assembly.

Notable Positions

Party Wise Distribution of Seats

Members of Legislative Assembly

See also 
 Uttar Pradesh Legislative Assembly
 2022 Uttar Pradesh Legislative Assembly election
 17th Uttar Pradesh Assembly

References

Uttar Pradesh Legislative Assembly
Uttar Pradesh
Uttar Pradesh MLAs 2022–2027